Heterotheca jonesii, known by the common name Jones's goldenaster, is a rare North American species of flowering plant in the family Asteraceae. It has been found in the southern part of the state of Utah in the United States.

References

jonesii
Flora of Utah
Plants described in 1895
Flora without expected TNC conservation status